Michael Dwumfour (born January 1, 1998) is an American football defensive tackle for the Cleveland Browns of the National Football League (NFL).

Early life and education
Dwumfour was born on January 1, 1998, in Scotch Plains, New Jersey. He attended Scotch Plains-Fanwood High School with Rashan Gary, before they both transferred, with Gary going to Paramus Catholic High School and Dwumfour moving to DePaul Catholic High School, playing for their football team. As a junior, he recorded 42 tackles and three quarterback sacks. Dwumfour posted 55 tackles and seven sacks as a high school senior, before committing to the University of Michigan. He was rated as a three-star prospect by ESPN, Rivals.com, and Scout.com.

As a true freshman at Michigan, he appeared in one game, the season-opener against Hawaii. As a sophomore, Dwumfour played in nine games, recording four tackles and one sack. He played in all 13 games in his junior year, starting two. He totaled 21 tackles, one interception, and three sacks in the season. As a senior in 2019, Dwumfour played in ten games with two starts, making nine tackles and one sack. He transferred to Rutgers for his final season in 2020. He started eight games at defensive tackle, and made 25 tackles, earning honorable mention All-Big Ten.

Professional career

New York Jets
After going unselected in the 2021 NFL Draft, Dwumfour signed with the New York Jets as an undrafted free agent. He impressed in the first preseason against the New York Giants, but suffered an injury which led to his release with an injury settlement shortly afterwards.

Houston Texans
Dwumfour was signed by the Houston Texans to the practice squad on October 13. He was activated on December 25, and made his debut in their game against the Los Angeles Chargers, recording a half-sack. He finished the season playing in three games and recording five tackles. He signed a reserve/future contract with the Texans on January 11, 2022.

On October 12, 2022, Dwumfour was placed on injured reserve. He was activated on November 19. He was waived on December 7.

San Francisco 49ers
On December 13, 2022, Dwumfour was signed to the San Francisco 49ers practice squad.

Cleveland Browns
On February 7, 2023, Dwumfour signed a reserve/futures deal with the Cleveland Browns.

References

External links
Michigan bio

1998 births
Living people
American football defensive linemen
DePaul Catholic High School alumni
People from Scotch Plains, New Jersey
Players of American football from New Jersey
Sportspeople from Union County, New Jersey
Michigan Wolverines football players
Rutgers Scarlet Knights football players
New York Jets players
Houston Texans players
San Francisco 49ers players
Cleveland Browns players